Meretrix lusoria, the hamaguri, Asian hard clam or common Orient clam, is a species of saltwater clam, a marine bivalve mollusk in the family Veneridae, the Venus clams. This species is native to Asia, found along water beds and the coastal waters of China, Korea, Sarawak (Malaysian Borneo), and Japan. It is commercially exploited for sushi, and its shells are traditionally used to make white go stones.

The hamaguri clam is the subject of a haiku by Matsuo Bashō.

See also
 Kai-awase, a Japanese game with hamaguri shells

References

Veneridae
Bivalves of Asia
Molluscs of the Pacific Ocean
Marine molluscs of Asia
Bivalves described in 1798